Michael Wayne Martin, known as Mike Martin (born March 9, 1952), is a Republican former member of the Texas House of Representatives from District 13 in Longview in Gregg County, Texas. He served from January 1981 until his resignation in April 1982.

Early life
Martin became a police officer in 1971. He served in the Air Force from 1975 through 1979.

Shooting
Martin fled, but Texas Rangers eventually apprehended Martin at his mother's farmhouse just outside Longview, where he was found hiding in a stereo cabinet.

He pleaded guilty in April 1982 and was convicted of misdemeanor perjury and paid a $2000 fine, though his lawyer said he did not admit staging the shooting.

Afterward
In the spring of 1982, voters in a special election returned Mankins to the vacant House seat.

In 1984, he and his wife, Debbie Martin, later of Garland, Texas, divorced.

In July 1986, Martin left with his two children, Michael Trent Martin (born 1978) and Arianna Martin (born 1981) to live and work in Wellington, New Zealand. A federal case was brought over the custody, and the Federal Bureau of Investigation allowed him to return the children to the United States late in 1988.

References

External links
Legislature roster from the Texas Legislative Research Library.
"Texas Tale: A shotgun approach to p.r." TIME Monday, Sep. 07, 1981
Burka, Paul "1982 Texas Monthly Bum Steer Awards", Texas Monthly (free registration needed, also on Google Books
 Essays Written by Mike Martin

1952 births
Living people
American perjurers
Republican Party members of the Texas House of Representatives
People from Longview, Texas
Politicians from Austin, Texas
Military personnel from Texas
United States Air Force airmen
Texas politicians convicted of crimes